"Big Me" is the fourth single by Foo Fighters from their self-titled debut album. Released in the spring of 1996, the song became a crossover hit for the band on pop radio, when it reached #13 on the Billboard Hot 100 Airplay.

Music video
The song became well known for its music video, which parodies Mentos advertisements, turning them into commercials for "Footos," with the "Freshmaker" slogan being rendered as "The Fresh Fighter". The concept came from director Jesse Peretz, who had originally pitched the idea to another band, and the Foo Fighters accepted the concept because, according to Dave Grohl, "We had some difficulty finding a treatment that would suit the song, which is this short, tongue-in-cheek, ridiculously candy-coated pop tune. We didn't want to make this big, pretentious portrait video. We wanted to make fun of ourselves and the song." The video made its MTV debut on February 14, 1996, and quickly became a Buzz Bin clip.

"Big Me" was nominated for 5 MTV Video Music Awards at the 1996 MTV Video Music Awards, winning only "Best Group Video". The video, which parodies the Mentos ad campaign, was filmed on location in Sydney, Australia.

The video's success led to many fans throwing Mentos at the band whenever they played the song live. For an extended period of time, the band did not play the song live due to this, as Grohl cited: "We did stop playing that song for a while because, honestly, it's like being stoned. Those little … things are like pebbles – they hurt." The band only started to change its mind after Weezer started performing "Big Me" during the Foozer tour both bands did together.

The music video was entirely filmed in Sydney Central Business District & North Sydney, Australia, in 1996.

2019 Record Store Day re-release

The "Big Me" single was re-released on a 3-inch vinyl for Record Store Day on April 13, 2019. The single is one of several 3-inch Record Store Day re-issues that is playable on special miniature record players.

Singles
CD single
"Big Me"
"Floaty (BBC Evening Session Recording 23 November 1995)"
"Gas Chamber (BBC Evening Session Recording 23 November 1995)" (Angry Samoans cover)
"Alone + Easy Target (BBC Evening Session Recording 23 November 1995)"

7" White Vinyl
"Big Me"
"Floaty (BBC Evening Sessions Recording 23 November 1995)
"Gas Chamber (BBC Evening Sessions Recording 23 November 1995) (Angry Samoans cover)

Maxi CD single
"Big Me"
"Winnebago"
"How I Miss You" (features Dave Grohl's sister Lisa on bass and Mike Nelson on drums)
"Podunk"
"Ozone" (Ace Frehley cover)
"For All the Cows" (live at the Reading Festival, August 26, 1995)
"Wattershed" (live at the Reading Festival, August 26, 1995)

3” Record Store Day 2019 Exclusive Single
 “Big Me”

Charts

Weekly charts

Year-end charts

References

External links
Walmart Soundcheck - Foo Fighters

1995 songs
1996 singles
American power pop songs
Jangle pop songs
Foo Fighters songs
Songs written by Dave Grohl
Sahara Hotnights songs
Music videos shot in Sydney
American pop rock songs